Tronzano may refer to:

Tronzano Lago Maggiore, Italian municipality in the province of Varese 
Tronzano Vercellese, Italian municipality in the province of Vercelli